Herman Charles Bosman (5 February 1905 – 14 October 1951) is widely regarded as South Africa's greatest short-story writer. He studied the works of Edgar Allan Poe and Mark Twain and developed a style emphasizing the use of satire. His English-language works utilize primarily Afrikaner characters and highlight the many contradictions in Afrikaner society during the first half of the twentieth century.

Early life
Bosman was born at Kuils River, near Cape Town, in Cape Colony, to an Afrikaner family. He was raised with English as well as Afrikaans. While Bosman was still young, his family travelled frequently, he spent a short time at Potchefstroom College which would later become Potchefstroom High School for Boys, he later  moved to Johannesburg where he went to school at Jeppe High School for Boys in Kensington. While there he contributed to the school magazine. When Bosman was sixteen, he started writing short stories for the national Sunday newspaper (the Sunday Times). He attended the Johannesburg College of Education (which in 2002 was incorporated into the University of the Witwatersrand) and submitted various pieces to student literary competitions.

Career and adult life
After graduation, Bosman accepted a teaching position in the Groot Marico district in an Afrikaans-language school. The area  provided the backdrop for his best-known short stories, the Oom Schalk Lourens series (featuring an older character named Oom Schalk Lourens) and the Voorkamer sketches.

Over the June school holidays in 1926, Bosman visited his family in Johannesburg. During an argument, he shot and killed his stepbrother. Bosman was sentenced to death for this crime and was sent to death row at the Pretoria Central Prison. His sentence was later reduced to ten years with hard labour. In 1930, Bosman was released on parole after serving half his sentence. His prison experiences formed the basis for his semi-autobiographical book, Cold Stone Jug.

Bosman then started his own printing-press company and was part of a literary set in Johannesburg, associating with poets, journalists and writers, including Aegidius Jean Blignaut. He toured overseas for nine years, spending most of his time in London. The short stories that he wrote during this period formed the basis for another of his best-known books, Mafeking Road. At the start of the Second World War, he returned to South Africa and worked as a journalist. During this time he translated the Rubaiyat of Omar Khayyam into Afrikaans.

Bosman lamented the fact that Johannesburg neglected its heritage. In The Standard Theatre he complained that the city's residents:

"will pull down the Standard Theatre like they have pulled down all the old buildings, theatres, gin-palaces, dosshouses, temples, shops, arcades, cafes and joints that were intimately associated with the mining-camp days of Johannesburg. Because I know Johannesburg. And I am satisfied that there is no other city in the world that is so anxious to shake off the memories of its early origins."

Bosman's second wife was Ella Manson. The couple were renowned for their bohemian lifestyle and parties, which featured witty conversation and usually ended well after midnight.

From 1948 to his death in 1951, Bosman was employed as proof editor at The Sunday Express. In addition, he was contracted to write a weekly Voorkamer story for The Forum magazine.

His last wife was Helena Lake (née Stegmann). After a housewarming party in October 1951, Bosman experienced severe chest pains and was taken to Edenvale Hospital. On admission, he was asked for his birthplace. He replied, "Born Kuilsrivier – Died Edenvale Hospital." He was discharged and collapsed at home a few hours later. Bosman died as he was being rushed to hospital. He is buried in Westpark Cemetery in Westdene under a triangular headstone that reads "Die Skrywer, The Writer, Herman Charles Bosman, b 3.2.1905, d 14.10.1951."

Legacy
After his death, the rights to his works were auctioned. They were purchased by his last wife, Helena, and upon her death, the rights were passed to her son, who retains them. In 1960, however, Helena sold some of his documents and 123 of his water colours and pencil sketches to the Harry Ransom Center in Texas.

Only three of his books were published during his lifetime: Mafeking Road published by Dassie, and Jacaranda in the Night and Cold Stone Jug published by APB. Mafeking Road has never been out of print since its publication in 1947.

His biography was written several times by Valerie Rosenberg. Her first effort was called Sunflower to the Sun, followed by Herman Charles Bosman, a Pictorial Biography, and most recently by Herman Charles Bosman: Between the Lines.  The last of these contains much new research and deals in detail with aspects of Bosman's life and parentage that were previously considered taboo.

Because many of his stories were originally published in long-forgotten magazines and journals, there are a number of anthologies by different collators each containing a different selection. His original books have also been published many times by different publishers.

The Herman Charles Bosman Literary Society meets annually for readings, performances and discussions of his works.

Books
Some of the ISBNs and publishers below may not be for the original edition.
 Mafeking Road & Other Stories (1947),  Human & Rousseau,  Archipelago Books (2008)
 Rubaijat van Omar Khajjam (1948), Colin Reed-McDonald
 Cold Stone Jug (1949),  Human & Rousseau
 Veld-trails and Pavements (1949), with Carel Bredell, Afrikaanse Pers-Boekhandel
 Cask of Jerepigo (1957), Central News Agency
 Unto Dust (1963), edited by Lionel Abrahams,  Anthony Blond
 Bosman at his Best: a choice of stories and sketches (1965) edited by Lionel Abrahams  Human & Rousseau
 Bosman's Johannesburg (1986) edited by Stephen Gray  Human & Rousseau
 Ramoutsa Road (1987)  Ad. Donker
 A Bekkersdal Marathon (1971),  Human & Rousseau
 The Earth is Waiting (1974)
 Willemsdorp (1977),  Human & Rousseau
 Almost Forgotten Stories (1979)  H. Timmins
 My Friend Herman Charles Bosman [1980] Perskor. author: Aegidius Jean Blignaut
 Dead End Road [1980] AD.Donker. author: Aegidius Jean Blignaut
 Selected Stories (1980), edited by Stephen Gray,  Human & Rousseau
 The Collected Works of Herman Charles Bosman (1981), edited by Lionel Abrahams,  Jonathan Ball
 The Bosman I like (1981), edited by Patrick Mynhardt,  Human & Rousseau
 Death Hath Eloquence (1981), edited by Aegidius Jean Blignaut,   Christelike Uitgewersmaatskappy
 Uncollected Essays (1981),  Timmins
 The Illustrated Bosman (1985),  Jonathan Ball
 Makapan's Cave and other stories (1987), edited by Stephen Gray,  Penguin Books.
 A Bosman Treasury (1991), edited by Ian Lusted,  Human & Rousseau
 Jurie Steyn's Post Office (1991),  Human & Rousseau
 Herman Charles Bosman : the prose juvenilia (1998), collected and introduced by M. C. Andersen,  University of South Africa
 Idle Talk : voorkamer stories (1999), edited by Craig MacKenzie,  Human & Rousseau
 Old Transvaal Stories (2000), edited by Craig MacKenzie,  Human & Rousseau
 The Rooinek and Other Boer War Stories (2000), edited by Craig MacKenzie,  Human & Rousseau
 Jacaranda in the Night (2000),  Human & Rousseau
 Best of Bosman (2001), edited by Stephen Gray and Craig MacKenzie,  Human & Rousseau
 Seed-Time and Harvest, and Other Stories (2001), edited by Craig MacKenzie,  Human & Rousseau
 Verborge Skatte: Herman Charles Bosman in/on Afrikaans (2001), collected by Leon de Kock,  Human & Rousseau

Plays
 Cold Stone Jug (1982) adapted by Barney Simon from the play by Stephen Gray  Human & Rousseau

Notes

External links
The Herman Charles Bosman Literary Society
City of Johannesburg Bosman page
 Snyman, Salomé. "Willemsdorp by Herman Charles Bosman: the small-town locale as fictional vehicle for commentary on social and moral issues in the South African historical context." Tydskrif vir letterkunde 49.2 (2012): 60-71.

1905 births
1951 deaths
People from Kuils River
Cape Colony people
Afrikaner people
South African male short story writers
South African people of Dutch descent
South African people convicted of murder
South African prisoners sentenced to death
South African short story writers
People convicted of murder by South Africa
Prisoners sentenced to death by South Africa
University of the Witwatersrand alumni
Burials at Westpark Cemetery